Ghazi Mohammad Ayub Khan  (1857 – 7 April 1914) also known as The Victor of Maiwand or The Afghan Prince Charlie was, for a while, the governor of Herat Province in the Emirate of Afghanistan. He was Emir of Afghanistan from 12 October, 1879 to 31 May, 1880. He also led the Afghan troops during the Second Anglo-Afghan War and defeated the British Indian Army at the Battle of Maiwand. Following his defeat at the Battle of Kandahar, Ayub Khan was deposed and exiled to British India. However, Ayub Khan fled to Persia (now Iran). After negotiations in 1888 with Sir Mortimer Durand, the ambassador at Tehran, Ayub Khan became a pensioner of the British Raj and traveled to British India in 1888, where he lived until his death in 1914 in Lahore, Punjab. He was buried in Peshawar and had eleven wives, fifteen sons, and ten daughters. Two of his grandsons, Sardar Hissam Mahmud el-Effendi and Sardar Muhammad Ismail Khan, served as brigadiers in the Pakistan Army.

In Afghanistan, he is remembered as the "National Hero of Afghanistan."

Early life
His father was Sher Ali Khan and his mother was the daughter of an influential Mohmand chief of Lalpura, Saadat Khan. His brother was Mohammad Yaqub Khan.

Second Anglo-Afghan war
During the second Anglo-Afghan war, Afghans under the command of Ayub Khan clashed with Anglo-Indian troops at Maiwand on 27 July 1880 and emerged victorious. The Afghan victory at Maiwand was strategically significant for Afghanistan as it saved the country from getting dismembered by Britain, and saved Qandahar from a permanent British occupation. The defeat at Maiwand also compelled the British to withdraw from Qandahar. After the battle, the Afghans buried the dead Anglo-Indian soldiers and erected a monument in their honor and memory.

Ayub Khan later went on to besiege the better equipped British forces at Kandahar but did not succeed. On 1 September, 1880, he was defeated and routed by forces led by General Frederick Roberts at the Battle of Kandahar, which saw the end of the Second Anglo-Afghan War.

After second Anglo-Afghan war
A year later, Ayub again tried to take Kandahar, this time from Amir Abdur Rahman Khan, but again failed.

"Ayub Khan had an opportunity of realizing his strength as an independent ruler in Afghanistan. Certain tribes in Kushk district having revolted, he desired to send a force from Herat to punish them; but when he asked his men to march, they refused, because he had not paid them for a long time." 
From The Twillingate Sun, Thursday, 3 February 1881.

He escaped to Persia (now Iran). After negotiations in 1888 with Sir Mortimer Durand, the ambassador at Tehran, Ayub Khan became a pensioner of the British Raj. A political officer, William Evans-Gordon, took charge of him on his arrival in India and escorted him with his entourage from Karachi to Rawalpindi. He lived in India until his death in 1914.

Death
He died in Lahore in 1914 and is buried in Peshawar near the shrine of Sheikh Habib at Durrani graveyard in Peshawar, Pakistan.

Legacy
In Afghanistan, he is remembered as the "National Hero of Afghanistan." He had eleven wives, fifteen sons, and ten daughters. Several of his descendants have served in various capacities in Pakistan. Two of his grandsons, Sardar Hissam Mahmud el-Effendi and Sardar Muhammad Ismail Khan, served with the rank of Brigadier in the Pakistan Army.

Sardar Hissam Mahmud el-Effendi
Sardar Hissam Mahmud el-Effendi was a grandson of Ayub Khan. He was the son of Sardar Muhammad Abdul Qadir Khan el-Effendi, the first son of Ayub Khan. He completed his education at Rashtriya Indian Military College in Dehra Dun, British India and was commissioned as second lieutenant on 15 July, 1939 in the British Indian Army. He fought in World War II and was initially posted in North Africa. El-Effendi was captured when his 11th Prince Albert Victor's Own Cavalry (PAVO) was overrun by German Afrika Korps, but managed to escape and rejoin his regiment. Later, he fought in the Burma Campaign. Following the independence of Pakistan, Hissam Mahmud el-Effendi opted to join Pakistan and served as a Brigadier in Pakistan Army.

After retiring from the military, he became a polo player and organised Pakistani polo for over twenty years, with leading teams invited to play from abroad. He died in 1983 in Lahore, and had two sons. One of his sons, Sardar Azmarai Javaid Hissam el-Effendi, was a professional polo player. He also coached the Pakistani polo team from 2003 to 2007 and was awarded Tamgha-e-Imtiaz in 1996 by the government of Pakistan.

References

Sources
 

Attribution

1857 births
1914 deaths
19th-century Afghan monarchs
Emirs of Afghanistan
Barakzai dynasty
Governors of Herat Province
Afghan military personnel
People of the Second Anglo-Afghan War
Pashtun people
19th-century Afghan politicians
19th-century monarchs in Asia
20th-century Afghan politicians
Afghan expatriates in India